Elena Fattori (born 15 June 1966) is an Italian politician, member of the Italian Senate from 2013 to 2022.

She was a member of the Five Star Movement from 2013 to 2019, and stood in the 2017 Five Star Movement primary election.
In 2019, she became an independent member of parliament.
In February 2021, Fattori joined Italian Left.

References

1966 births
Living people
Five Star Movement politicians
Italian Left politicians
Women legislators in Italy
People from Rimini
Sapienza University of Rome alumni
20th-century Italian women
21st-century Italian women